= Defenders of Gibraltar =

Political action group in Gibraltar

Defenders of Gibraltar is a political action group in the British Overseas Territory of Gibraltar.

The group has protested what they describe as harassment and bullying of Gibraltar by the Spanish Government and have supported British sovereignty over the territory.

In 2012, the group collected 10,000 signatures on a petition. It claimed that 99% of the people canvassed supported the aim of the petition.

The group claims that "The Spanish Government continues to deny us our universal rights and ability to determine our own future."
